Vidya Thakur (born 15 June 1963) is a leader of Bharatiya Janata Party and a member of 13th Maharashtra Legislative Assembly from Goregaon. She is Minister of State for Women and Child Development, Food and Civil Supplies and Consumer Protection, Food and Drugs Administration in Devendra Fadnavis Ministry. On 10 July 2016 she was relieved of responsibility for food and drug administration in a cabinet reshuffle.

Education and early career
Thakur attended Kudilal Govindram Sekseria Sarvodaya School, finishing in 1977.

Political career
Vidya Thakur first time won election of Brihanmumbai Municipal Corporation in 1992.

Positions held

Within BJP
Ex. General Secretary BJP Mumbai Mahila Morcha

Legislative
Brihanmumbai Municipal Corporation 2007
Ex.Public Health Committee Chairperson
Deputy Mayor, Brihanmumbai Municipal Corporation on 17 March 2007
Member, Maharashtra Legislative Assembly - since 2014

See also
 Devendra Fadnavis ministry (2014–)
 Make in Maharashtra

References

Living people
1963 births
Maharashtra MLAs 2014–2019
People from Mumbai Suburban district
Marathi politicians
21st-century Indian women politicians
21st-century Indian politicians
Bharatiya Janata Party politicians from Maharashtra
Women members of the Maharashtra Legislative Assembly